Horodok Air Base (also known as Gorodok Air Base, Cherlyany Air Base, and Cherlyane Air Base) was an air base in Ukraine located 5 km southeast of Horodok. It was a fighter base with revetted areas, 26 km southwest of Lviv.

The base was home to the:
 3rd Guards Rostov-Donskiy Red Banner Fighter Aviation Regiment PVO between July 1945 and June 1949 under the Soviet Air Forces.

During the 1970s or early 1980s it hosted a regiment of Sukhoi Su-24 (Fencer) aircraft.

References

Soviet Air Force bases
Ukrainian airbases